The Sleeper is a single British television crime drama film, written by Gwyneth Hughes and directed by Stuart Orme, that first broadcast on BBC1 on 26 December 2000. The film was initially broadcast in two parts, and is based on the novel by Gillian White.

The film was commissioned as part of the BBC's £42 million-pound Christmas schedule line-up for 2000. Neither part of the film attracted more than 6.4 million viewers, placing it outside of the Top 30 most watched programmes that week. Although the film remains unreleased on VHS or DVD, both parts are available to watch on YouTube.

Plot
The Sleeper focuses on the Moon family, headed by Violet (Eileen Atkins), who descend into conflict when Fergus (Ciarán Hinds) and Claire (Annabelle Apsion), Violet's son and daughter-in-law, decide to sell the family farm from beneath her.

In Part One, as the family gather in the farmhouse to spend one last family Christmas together, a figure from Violet's past, determined to exact revenge, makes his way up to the farm amidst a rain and hail storm which cuts off power in the area, leaving the farm in pitch darkness.

In Part Two, suspicious are raised amongst the family when Cath goes missing, forcing Lillian and George to mount a search party. Claire also begins to suspect her mother's motives for bringing the family together.

Cast
 Eileen Atkins as Violet Moon
 Anna Massey as Lillian Kessel
 George Cole as George Gleeson
 Michelle Collins as Diana Wakeham
 Ciarán Hinds as Fergus Moon
 Annabelle Apsion as Claire Moon
 Elizabeth Spriggs as Cath Marks
 Simon Chandler as Jonna Wakeham
 Eric Byrne as Sam Wakeham
 Julia Deakin as Valerie Fellgett
 Rupert Frazer as David Litton
 Christine Kavanagh as Sheena Marks
 Gerard Horan as Sergeant Pollard
 Simon Quarterman as PC Browning
 Jimmy Gardner as Ernest Page
 Andrea Lowe as Donna Dawes
 Sheila Reid as Mrs. Fitzhall
 Sophie Harmer	as Young Kitty
 Hannah Powell	as Young Violet
 Ian McNeice as Mr. Tarbuck

See also
 The Sleeper

References

External links

BBC television dramas
2000 British television series debuts
2000 British television series endings
2000s British drama television series
English-language television shows